Ashish Kumar Saha is an Indian politician from Tripura, India. In 2018 assembly elections, he represented Town Bardowali constituency in West Tripura in Tripura Legislative Assembly.

Political career
In 2016, he was one of the six MLAs from Indian National Congress who joined All India Trinamool Congress, due to unhappiness with the party because of allying with the Communist Party of India (Marxist) in 2016 West Bengal Legislative Assembly election.

On 23 December 2016, Saha demanded that Tripura Forest and Rural development Minister Naresh Jamatia (CPI-M) be removed over a sex scandal that Jamatia was allegedly involved in.

In August 2017, he was one of the six MLAs from All India Trinamool Congress who joined Bharatiya Janata Party. In 2022 he rejoined Indian National Congress.

References

People from West Tripura district
Living people
Year of birth missing (living people)
Tripura politicians
Indian National Congress politicians
Trinamool Congress politicians
Bharatiya Janata Party politicians from Tripura
Tripura MLAs 2018–2023